Rock Creek Methodist Episcopal Church is a historic Methodist Episcopal church located at Chance, Somerset County, Maryland. It is a cross-plan Gothic-style church supported by a continuous common bond brick foundation, built in 1900.  It features a three-story bell tower capped by a pyramidal spire.  Also on the property is a single-story "L"-shaped frame church hall built in 1928.

It was listed on the National Register of Historic Places in 1990.

References

External links
, including photo in 1986, at Maryland Historical Trust

Methodist churches in Maryland
Churches on the National Register of Historic Places in Maryland
Churches in Somerset County, Maryland
Churches completed in 1900
19th-century Methodist church buildings in the United States
Gothic Revival church buildings in Maryland
National Register of Historic Places in Somerset County, Maryland